This is a list of ambassadors of the United States to the Republic of the Congo.

From 1885 until 1960, the republic had been under the control of France as a protectorate. In 1908, France organized French Equatorial Africa (AEF), comprising its colonies of Middle Congo (modern Congo), Gabon, Chad, and Oubangui-Chari (now Central African Republic). Brazzaville was selected as the federal capital.

In 1958 Middle Congo became an autonomous colony and was renamed Republic of the Congo. The republic was granted full independence on August 15, 1960. As the Belgian Congo (now the Democratic Republic of the Congo) also chose the name Republic of Congo upon receiving its independence, the two countries were more commonly known as Congo-Leopoldville and Congo-Brazzaville, after their capital cities.

The United States immediately recognized the new Republic of the Congo and moved to establish diplomatic relations. The embassy in Brazzaville was established August 15, 1960, with Alan W. Lukens as Chargé d'Affaires ad interim. The first ambassador, W. Wendell Blancke was appointed on November 9, 1960.

Ambassadors

Notes

See also
Republic of the Congo – United States relations
Foreign relations of the Republic of the Congo
Ambassadors of the United States

References
United States Department of State: Background notes on the Republic of Congo

External links
 United States Department of State: Chiefs of Mission for the Republic of Congo
 United States Department of State: Republic of the Congo
 United States Embassy in Brazzaville

Congo, Republic of the
Main
United States